Lulusar-Dodipat National Park is located in the Kaghan Valley in Mansehra District of Khyber-Pakhtunkhwa, Pakistan. The park was created in 2003. The scenic Dudipatsar Lake and Lulusar Lake and peaks are in the park.

Flora and fauna
The flora  includes the trees, shrubs, perennials, and herbs of the Himalayan Western Himalayan subalpine conifer forests and higher elevation Western Himalayan alpine shrub and meadows ecoregions.  Some of the park's fauna includes the snow leopard, black bear, marmot, weasel, lynx, leopard, Himalayan snowcock, and the snow partridge. The park's lakes and wetlands habitats are of significant ecological importance for resident fauna and migratory waterfowl.

Access
The road is accessible by cars and motorbikes. The 2005 Kashmir earthquake in North Pakistan made access more difficult. However, since 2006 the Pakistan government has taken steps to restore tourism in the Kaghan Valley, including rebuilding and new tourism facilities and infrastructure.

Region
Saiful Muluk National Park, with Lake Saiful Muluk, is adjacent to Lulusar-Dodipat National Park in the Kaghan Valley region. Together the parks protect .

Lakes
 Dudipatsar Lake-Dudipatsar Lake or Dudipat Lake is a lake encircled by snow clad peaks in Lulusar-Dudipatsar National Park. The lake lies in the extreme north of the Naran Valley. The word "dudi" means white, "pat" means mountains and "sar" means lake. This name has been given to the lake because of the white color of snow at surrounding peaks. In summer the water of the lake reflects like a mirror. The word "sar" is used with the name of each lake in the area, translating as 'lake.
 Lulusar Lake-Lulusar is group of mountain peaks and a lake in the Naran Valley in the Khyber-Pakhtunkhwa province of Pakistan. The word "sar" means "top" or "peak" in Pashto. The highest peak has a height of 11,200 ft (3,410 m) above sea level (N35.0804 E73.9266).

See also
Dudipatsar Trail
Makra Peak
Malika Parbat Peak

References

National parks of Pakistan
Mansehra District
Protected areas of Khyber Pakhtunkhwa
Parks in Khyber Pakhtunkhwa